Visoka oil field is an Albanian oil field that was discovered in 1963. It is situated near the village Visokë, northwest of the town Ballsh. It is one of the biggest on-shore oil field of Albania. It began production in 1964 and produces oil.

See also

Oil fields of Albania

References

Oil fields of Albania